Murthal is a village in Sonipat district of the Indian state of Haryana. It is famous for its parathas.

Demographics 

According to the 1883 gazetteer of the Gurgaon District, the inhabitants of this village were Jats, mainly those of Antal clan.

Culture

Cuisine
The Dhabas
Since Murthal falls in between many routes, it has become notable for its highway dhabas (small restaurants) and its food delicacies.

Transport

Regional Rapid Transport System
In December 2020, the Haryana government approved the implementation of Delhi-Panipat Corridor for its Regional Rapid Transport System. The construction will be undertaken in two stages namely, Sarai Kale Khan to Murthal depot and Murthal to Panipat.

Education

Universities
 Deenbandhu Chhotu Ram University of Science and Technology, also known as DCRUST. Many colleges are affiliated to this university.
 Tau Devi Lal Government Women College, Murthal

References

Cities and towns in Sonipat district